Kariya is a 2003 Indian Kannada-language gangster film written and directed by Prem, starring Darshan and Abinayasri. It narrates the tragic story of a homeless assassin-for-hire Kariya, who falls for Maya, a well educated and rich dancer. Although she tries to convey her feelings, Kariya hesitantly moves away causing her to pledge that she will only reciprocate his feelings if he proclaims his love for her. Meanwhile, a few local thugs try to entrap Kariya and seek vengeance for the death of their friend.

Cast
 Darshan as Kariya
 Abinayasri as Maya 
 Mico Nagaraj
 Umesh Punga 
 Nanda Kishore 
 Dashavara Chandru 
 Nandesh
 John 
 B. Jayashree
 Five Star Ganesh 
 Dr. Suresh Sharma 
The film features twenty-three real underworld gangsters.

Soundtrack

Production 
Kariya is the debut film of Prem as a director before Excuse Me. Having a gangster backdrop, director Prem and producer Anekal Balaraj bailed out 23 criminals to act in the film. Balraj tried to persuade a female mobster Mari Mutthu to act in the film. However, Mari Muthu who was a councilor refused the offer, and kariya movie creates violence in society and fearing it might tarnish her reputation. Certain scenes involving these rowdies were shot in exactly the same spot where they have killed or assaulted their targets in the past. Darshan, who made his debut through the crime film Majestic was chosen to play the titular role, while Abhirami, daughter of actress Anuradha was signed in to play the female lead. Gurukiran has scored and composed the film's soundtrack. The cinematography was handled by Seenu.

Release 
Kariya received an A certificate from regional office of the Censor Board at Bangalore with the certificate dated 30 December 2002. The film was released on 3 January 2003.

Reception

Critical reception 
The film received mixed response from critics upon release. Gangadhara of Deccan Herald felt the film "fails to have a tight storyline" but is technically, "well-made". He added, "As the debutant director Prem fails to effectively convey the story, it gets dragged on till the end. Also, the director is quite unconvincing in giving the film a definite flow." He opined that the film had shades of Om (1995) and Darshan's own Majestic that released earlier that year. He further wrote, "Darshan looks insipid and tired throughout the film as he has neither worked on his looks nor on his expressions, which seem monotonous. Darshan could have been a bit sharper. Abhinayashri looks smarter than Darshan. She attracts a lot of attention in acting department as well as dance sequences. M R Seenu's cinematography is superb. Debutant director Prem seems to be too excited with the script as a newcomer to the medium." According to Viggy.com, "There are some catchy dialogues and comedy to make you laugh if you are freezed looking at the blood pool." Though they criticized the musical score by Gurukiran and the wrong casting of Darshan in the lead role, the film's cinematography and Prem's direction received praise. The similarities of certain scenes with that of Om and Satya were pointed out. Chitraloka criticised the film for not catering much to the women or the younger generation. But the reviewer praised Darshan's performance, Gurukiran's music and M. R. Seenu's camerawork. The film was also lauded for its technical prowess. Nettv4u gave the film 3.5 stars on 5 calling Kariya one of Darshan's best films which could draw more of his fans to theatres to watch the different effort. While the film received praise for its technical aspects, direction and cinematography the film was criticized for its violence.

Box office 
Kariya had a big opening. It ran for 56 days at Kapali theatre during its first release. At the end of its first run, the film was declared a sleeper hit. However, due to demand by the viewers, the film was released again when it turned out to be a greater success, enjoying a theatrical run of more than 100 days. During its second release, the film was declared a Blockbuster completing a theatrical run of 675 days in Karnataka.

Controversy
There is a song in the film called "Avalu Nanage Sigadiddare Acid Hakuve" ("If I don't get you, I will pour acid on you").  The Karnataka State Commission for Women has asked the censor board to ban such films, claiming they encouraged crimes against women.

Legacy
The sequel Kariya 2, which was unrelated to the 2003 film was released in 2017. However, both films were produced by Anekal Balaraju.

References

Films set in Bangalore
2003 films
2000s Kannada-language films
Films scored by Gurukiran
Films shot in Bangalore
Indian gangster films
Indian crime action films
2003 action films
Films directed by Prem